Nicolás Mangieri Cauterucce is a Venezuelan lawyer and entrepreneur.

Mangieri has had successfully careers in the energy, tourism, and construction business ventures. He is a contributing expert to the World Justice Project. He is also active in higher education; he is a regional director (Venezuela) for the Organização das Américas para a Excelência Educativa (ODAEE); and president of the Universidad Nueva Esparta in Caracas (2006 – present).

References

1966 births
Living people
20th-century Venezuelan lawyers
Venezuelan businesspeople